USS Honolulu has been the name of more than one United States Navy ship, and may refer to:

USS Honolulu (ID-1843), a cargo ship in commission from 1917 to 1919
, a light cruiser in commission from 1938 from 1947
, a submarine in commission from 1985 to 2007

United States Navy ship names